Richard Abikhair (7 July 1914 – 20 August 1962) was an Australian rules footballer who played with Hawthorn and North Melbourne. Of Lebanese descent, Abikhair usually played as a rover or in the back pocket. His career was partially shortened by the declaration of World War II.

Abikhair was captain-coach of Casterton Football Club when they defeated Hamilton to win the 1939 Western District Football League grand final.

Following his playing career, Abikhair began coaching at the amateur level. While coaching the Carlton Rovers in the Sunday Amateur Football League he received a bomb threat to his Clifton Hill home. League secretary W. H. Linnington also received similar threats to his Brunswick home. Police patrolled the area and nothing materialised of the threats.

References

Sources
 Holmesby, Russell & Main, Jim (2007). The Encyclopedia of AFL Footballers. 7th ed. Melbourne: Bas Publishing.

External links

1914 births
1962 deaths
Australian rules footballers from Victoria (Australia)
Hawthorn Football Club players
North Melbourne Football Club players
Camberwell Football Club players